Carsten Bjørnlund (born 28 June 1973) is a Danish theatre, film and television actor.

Bjørnlund's first leading film role was Rasmus in 2008's One-Way Ticket to Korsør. He played one of the leading characters in the second series of Forbrydelsen (The Killing). Among his film roles are Karl in The Thing (2011) and Martin in ID:A (2011).
He also played the male character in the 2012 music video for "The Fall" by Rhye.

From 2012 to 2015, he played the character Rasmus in TV2's comedy-drama "Rita". The show returned in 2020, featuring Carsten Bjørnlund.

Since 2014 he has been playing one of the leads in the drama Arvingerne (The Legacy).

Bjørnlund has two sons, Bertram and Vilfred and a daughter, Ziggy.

In 2004, he married Danish actress Signe Skov, with whom he had two sons (Bertram Bjørnlund and Vilfred Bjørnlund). They divorced in 2011. He began dating designer Christie Fals, with whom he had a daughter, Ziggy Bjørnlund, at the beginning of October 2016.

Filmography

References

External links 
 

1973 births
20th-century Danish male actors
21st-century Danish male actors
Danish male film actors
Danish male television actors
Living people
Male actors from Copenhagen